Binibining Pilipinas 2004 was the 41st edition of Binibining Pilipinas. It took place  at the Smart Araneta Coliseum in Quezon City, Metro Manila, Philippines on March 6, 2004.

At the end of the event, Carla Gay Balingit crowned Maricar Balagtas as Binibining Pilipinas-Universe 2004. Maria Rafaela Yunon crowned Maria Karla Bautista as Bb. Pilipinas-World 2004, while Jhezarie Javier crowned Margaret-Ann Bayot as Bb. Pilipinas-International 2004. Tracy Ann Javelona was named First Runner-Up and Princess Jasmine Tiongson was named 2nd Runner-Up.

Results

Color keys
  The contestant was a Runner-up in an International pageant.
  The contestant was a Semi-Finalist in an International pageant.
  The contestant did not place.

Special Awards

Contestants
25 contestants competed for the three titles.

Notes

Post-pageant Notes
 Maricar Balagtas competed at Miss Universe 2004 in Quito, Ecuador but was unplaced. On the other hand, Maria Karla Bautista was one of the Top 5 when she competed at Miss World 2004 in Sanya, China. Bautista was then named as the Continental Queen of Asia & Oceania.
 Margaret-Ann Bayot competed at Miss International 2004 in Beijing and was of the 15 semifinalists. After her stint in Miss International, Bayot competed at Miss Maja Mundial 2004 in Colombia and was named Virreina (1st Runner-Up)
 Sheila Margrethe Alonso competed at Miss Philippines Earth 2004 and was crowned Miss Philippines Fire 2004.

References

2004
2004 in the Philippines
2004 beauty pageants